Iranian singer Googoosh has a recording career tracing back to 1966, when she released her first single “Ghesseye Vafaa”

Studio albums

Compilation Albums
 1996: Best of Googoosh, Vol, 1: Jadeh
 1996: Best of Googoosh, Vol. 2: Mordab
 1997: Best of Googoosh, Vol. 5: Kavir
 1997: Best of Googoosh, Vol. 3: Doe Mahi
 2000: Best of Googoosh, Vol. 4: Doe Panjereh
 ?: Best of Googoosh, Vol. 6
 2000: Best of Googoosh "Forever"
 2005: Golden Songs Vol. 1
 2005: Golden Songs Vol. 2
 ?: Googoosh: 40 Golden Hits
 ?: 70's Golden Hits

'Best of 60's' Compilation Albums
 2005: Best of 60's "Volume 2" Music of 1960 -1969
 2005: Best of 60's "Volume 3" Music of 1960-1969

'Best of 70's' Compilation Albums
 2005: Best of 70's, "Volume 1", Music of 1970-1979
 2005: Best of 70's, "Volume 2", Music of 1970-1979
 2005: Best of 70's, Volume 3", Music of 1970-1979
 2005: Best of 70's, "Volume 5", Music of 1970-1979
 2005: Best of 70's, "Volume 6", Music of 1970-1979
 2005: Best of 70's, "Volume 7", Music of 1970-1979
 2005: Best of 70's, "Volume 8", Music of 1970-1979
 2005: Best of 70's, "Volume 9", Music of 1970-1979
 2005: Best of 70's, "Volume 10", Music of 1970-1979
 2005: Best of 70's, "Volume 13", Music of 1970-1979
 2005: Best of 70's, "Volume 14", Music of 1970-1979

Videos/DVDs
 ?: Tohmat (DVD and CD set)
 ?: Googoosh 3 DVD Box Set

Live Albums:
 ?: Live in Concert
 1999: Googoosh Live in Concert
 2001: Live in Concert

References

Discographies of Iranian artists
Pop music discographies